Bruce King (born January 7, 1963) is a former American football fullback in the National Football League. He split his 3-year career with the Kansas City Chiefs and the Buffalo Bills. He played college football at Purdue. During his career, King was the only rookie fullback/running back to start on opening day of the 1985 season.

High School career
King graduated from Heritage Hills High School, where he helped lead the Patriots to a 3-yr record of 25-5 (1978 season 6-4, 1979 season 9-1, 1980 season 10-0), were consistently ranked in the Top Ten and won 2 PAC conference titles.  A two-way player (Running Back & Linebacker), King was an Indiana North-South All-Star, winning MVP honors. He was tapped as an All-Region, All-State and All-American; spurning offers from the Michigan Wolverines and Ohio State Buckeyes, he accepted a scholarship to play football for Jim Young and study engineering at Purdue University.

Following his collegiate career, he was awarded the Rabold Award from the Indiana Football Coaches Association for "Excellence in College Football," joining the ranks of other award winners such as Mark Herrmann, Rod Woodson, Darrick Brownlow, Kevin Hardy, Roosevelt Colvin, Jay Cutler and Anthony Spencer.

A multi-sport athlete, he also helped led the Patriots to their first (of 11) IHSAA Sectional Titles during the 1979-80 basketball season.  He also lettered in baseball and track & field.

In 2022, he was selected for induction into the Indiana Football Hall of Fame.

College career
King attended Purdue University for four years, where he was selected as Captain for his senior season and helped lead Purdue to the 1984 Peach Bowl. He averaged 5.6 yards per attempt; totaling over 1,100 yards and scoring 7 touchdowns during his Purdue career before graduating in 1985 with a bachelor's degree in management.  He was a 3-year starter, blocking for future NFL great Mel Gray and Jim Everett.  Fellow offensive backfield teammates were future Pittsburgh Steelers running back Rodney Carter, Eric Jordan of the Oakland Invaders and Ray Wallace of the Houston Oilers and Pittsburgh Steelers .

Professional career
King was drafted by the Oakland Invaders of the USFL in the 8th round of the 1985 draft but chose to sign with the Kansas City Chiefs of the NFL, having been taken by the Chiefs in the 5th round of the NFL draft, as the 126th player taken overall.  King started 6 games as a rookie fullback with the Chiefs, gaining 83 yards.  He was traded to the Buffalo Bills 4 games into the 1986 season.  He spent the entire 1987 season with the Bills, gaining 28 yards in 2 starts.  After the end of the 1987 NFL players strike and a try-out with the Miami Dolphins, he retired from professional football.

References

External links
 https://www.pro-football-reference.com/players/K/KingBr00.htm

1963 births
Living people
People from Spencer County, Indiana
Players of American football from Indiana
American football fullbacks
Purdue Boilermakers football players
Kansas City Chiefs players
Buffalo Bills players